Harold Smith Prince (born Harold Smith; January 30, 1928 – July 31, 2019), commonly known as Hal Prince, was an American theatre director and producer known for his work in musical theatre.

One of the foremost figures in 20th century American theatre, Prince became associated throughout his career with many of the most noteworthy musicals in Broadway history, including West Side Story, Fiddler on the Roof, Cabaret, Sweeney Todd, and Phantom of the Opera, the longest running show in Broadway history. Many of his productions broke new ground for musical theater, expanding the possibilities of the form by incorporating more serious and political subjects, such as Nazism (Cabaret), the difficulties of marriage (Company), and the forcible opening of 19th-century Japan (Pacific Overtures).

Over the span of his career, he garnered 21 Tony Awards, including eight for directing, eight for producing the year's Best Musical, two as Best Producer of a Musical, and three special awards.

Early life
Prince was born to an affluent family in Manhattan, the son of Blanche ( Stern) and Harold Smith. He was adopted by his stepfather, Milton A. Prince, a stockbroker. His family was of German Jewish descent. Following his graduation from the Franklin School, later called the Dwight School, in New York, he entered the University of Pennsylvania, where he followed a liberal arts curriculum and graduated in three years at age 19. He later served two years with the United States Army in post-World War II Germany.

Career
Prince began work in the theatre as an assistant stage manager to theatrical producer and director George Abbott. Along with Abbott, he co-produced The Pajama Game, which won the 1955 Tony Award for Best Musical. He received Tony Awards for 1956's Damn Yankees, 1960's Fiorello! and 1963's A Funny Thing Happened on the Way to the Forum, and Tony nominations for 1958's West Side Story and New Girl in Town. He went on to direct and produce his own productions in 1962 beginning with the unsuccessful A Family Affair followed by his first critically successful musical, She Loves Me (Tony nomination, 1964).

He received a Tony Award for producing Fiddler on the Roof (1965) and almost gave up musical theatre before his Tony winning success directing and producing with Kander and Ebb's Cabaret in 1966, followed by Kander and Ebb's Zorba (Tony nomination, 1969). 1970 marked the start of his greatest creative collaboration, with composer/lyricist Stephen Sondheim. They had previously worked on West Side Story and their association spawned a long string of landmark productions, including Company (Tony Award, 1970), Follies (Tony Award, 1971), A Little Night Music (Tony Award, 1973), Pacific Overtures (Tony nomination, 1976), Side by Side by Sondheim (Tony nomination, 1977), and Sweeney Todd (Tony Award, 1979). Following Merrily We Roll Along (1981), which ran for 16 performances, they parted ways until Bounce in 2003.

He received a Tony nomination for directing On the Twentieth Century (1978) and won twice for the Andrew Lloyd Webber musicals Evita (1980) and The Phantom of the Opera (1988). Between them, Prince was offered the job of directing Cats by Lloyd Webber but turned it down and directed A Doll's Life (1982) with lyricists Betty Comden and Adolph Green. The musical continued the story of Nora Helmer past what Henrik Ibsen had written in A Doll's House. It ran for five performances; The New York Times wrote, "It was overproduced and overpopulated to the extent that the tiny resolute figure of Nora became lost in the combined mechanics of Broadway and the Industrial Revolution." Broadway wags dubbed the show either "A Doll's Death" or, due to the omnipresent portal out of which Nora slammed in the prologue, "A Door's Life."

Prince's other commercially unsuccessful musicals included Grind (Tony nomination, 1985), which closed after 71 performances, and Roza (1987). However, his production of The Phantom of the Opera eventually became the longest-running show in Broadway history. Prince ultimately stopped producing because he "became more interested in directing". Kiss of the Spider Woman, which he directed in 1993, received the Tony Award for Best Musical. In 1994, Prince became a Kennedy Center Honoree. He received a 1995 Tony Award for directing Showboat, and was nominated again for 1999's Parade.

In 2000, he was awarded the National Medal of Arts. In 2006, Prince was awarded a Special Tony Award for Lifetime Achievement in the Theatre. In 2007, he directed his last original musical on Broadway, LoveMusik and on May 20 of that year, he gave the commencement address at Gettysburg College in Gettysburg, Pennsylvania. He was presented with the American Academy of Achievement's Golden Plate Award by awards council member and author Toni Morrison at a 2007 ceremony in Washington, D.C. In 2008 Prince was the keynote speaker at Elon University's Convocation for Honors celebration.

Prince co-directed, with Susan Stroman, the 2010 musical Paradise Found. The musical features the music of Johann Strauss II as adapted by Jonathan Tunick with lyrics by Ellen Fitzhugh. The book was written by Richard Nelson, based on Joseph Roth's novel The Tale of the 1002nd Night. The musical premiered at the Menier Chocolate Factory in London on May 19, 2010 and closed on June 26, and starred Mandy Patinkin.

A retrospective of Prince's work titled Prince of Broadway was co-directed by Prince and Susan Stroman and presented by Umeda Arts Theater in Tokyo, Japan in October 2015. The book was written by David Thompson with additional material and orchestrations by Jason Robert Brown. Prince was slated to direct The Band's Visit in 2016 but withdrew due to scheduling conflicts. Prince of Broadway opened in August 2017 at the Samuel J. Friedman Theatre in New York with a cast featuring Chuck Cooper, Janet Dacal, Bryonha Marie Parham, Emily Skinner, Brandon Uranowitz, Kaley Ann Voorhees, Michael Xavier, Tony Yazbeck, and Karen Ziemba.

In addition to musicals, Prince also directed operas including Josef Tal's Ashmedai, Carlisle Floyd's Willie Stark, Puccini's Madama Butterfly, and a revival of Bernstein's Candide (Tony Award, 1974). In 1983 Prince staged Turandot for the Vienna State Opera (conductor: Lorin Maazel; with José Carreras and Éva Marton).

Legacy
Prince was the inspiration for John Lithgow's character in Bob Fosse's film All That Jazz. He was also assumed to be the basis of a character in Richard Bissell's novel Say, Darling, which chronicled Bissell's own experience turning his novel 7½ Cents into The Pajama Game.

According to Masterworks Broadway, "besides his achievements as a producer and director, Prince is also known for bringing innovation to the theatrical arts. In collaboration with Stephen Sondheim, he was a pioneer in the development of the 'concept musical,' taking its departure from an idea or theme rather than from a traditional story. Their first project of this kind, Company (1970), was a solid success and paved the way for other innovative musicals."

According to The New York Times, "He was known, too, for his collaborations with a murderer's row of creative talents, among them the choreographers Bob Fosse, Jerome Robbins, Michael Bennett and Susan Stroman; the designers Boris Aronson, Eugene Lee, Patricia Zipprodt and Florence Klotz; and the composers Leonard Bernstein, John Kander, Stephen Sondheim and Andrew Lloyd Webber."

The Harold Prince Theatre at the Annenberg Center of the University of Pennsylvania is named in his honor.

A documentary titled Harold Prince: The Director's Life was directed by Lonny Price and broadcast on PBS Great Performances in November 2018.

In 2019, The New York Public Library for the Performing Arts presented an extensive exhibit honoring the life and work of Harold Prince. Prince served as a trustee for the library and on the National Council of the Arts of the National Endowment for the Arts. At the behest of Lotte Lenya, whom he cast in Cabaret (1966), Prince also served on the Board of Trustees of The Kurt Weill Foundation for Music and as a judge of their Lotte Lenya Competition.

Andrew Lloyd Webber said: "There isn't anybody working on musical theater on either side of the Atlantic who doesn't owe an enormous debt to this extraordinary man....Hal was very minimalist with his sets. People think of Phantom as this great big spectacle. That's an illusion. Hal always looked at the show as this big black box in which the stage craft enabled you to believe there was this impressive scenery all around you."

Jason Robert Brown said: "More than anything else, when I think about Hal, I think about his belief in theater. He believed in what it could do....He thought a lot about the world and the political systems and emotional support systems in it. He was very much a political artist."

Personal life
Prince married Judy Chaplin, daughter of composer and musical director Saul Chaplin, on October 26, 1962. They are parents of Daisy Prince, a director, and Charles Prince, a conductor. Actor Alexander Chaplin, best known as "James Hobert" on Spin City, is Prince's son-in-law. At the time of his death, Prince lived in Manhattan and Switzerland.

Death
Prince died in Reykjavík, Iceland, on July 31, 2019, at the age of 91.

The marquee lights of Broadway theatres were dimmed on July 31, 2019, in the traditional gesture of honor. A memorial was held at Broadway's Majestic Theatre on December 16, 2019.

Work

Stage productions 
Source: Playbill (vault); Internet Broadway Database

 Tickets, Please! (1950) – assistant stage manager
 Call Me Madam (1950) – assistant stage manager
 Wonderful Town (1953) – stage manager
 The Pajama Game (1954) – co-producer
 Damn Yankees (1955) – co-producer
 New Girl in Town (1957) – co-producer
 West Side Story (1957) – co-producer
 Fiorello! (1959) – co-producer
 West Side Story (1960) – co-producer
 Tenderloin (1960) – co-producer
 They Might Be Giants (1961) – co-producer
 A Call on Kuprin (1961) – producer
 Take Her, She's Mine (1961) – producer
 A Family Affair (1962) – director
 A Funny Thing Happened on the Way to the Forum (1962) – producer
 She Loves Me (1963) – producer, director
 Fiddler on the Roof (1964) – producer
 Baker Street (1964) – director
 Flora, The Red Menace (1965) – producer
 It's a Bird...It's a Plane...It's Superman (1966) – producer, director
 Cabaret (1966) – producer, director
 Zorba (1968) – producer, director
 Company (1970) – producer, director
 Follies (1971) – producer, director
 The Great God Brown (1972) – artistic director
 Don Juan (1972) – artistic director
 A Little Night Music (1973) – director, producer
 Sondheim: A Musical Tribute (1973) – performer
 The Visit (1973) – director
 Chemin de Fer (1973) – artistic director
 Holiday (1973) – artistic director
 Candide (1974) – producer, director
 Love for Love (1974) – director
 The Member of the Wedding (1975) – artistic director
 The Rules of the Game (1974) – artistic director
 Pacific Overtures (1976) – producer, director
 Side by Side by Sondheim (1977) – producer
 Some of My Best Friends (1977) – director
 On the Twentieth Century (1978) – director
 Sweeney Todd (1979) – director
 Evita (1979) – director
 Merrily We Roll Along (1981) – director
 Willie Stark (1981) – director
 A Doll's Life (1982) – producer, director
 Play Memory (1984) – director
 Diamonds (1984) – director
 Grind (1985) – producer, director
 The Phantom of the Opera (1986) – director
 Roza (1987) – director
 Cabaret (1987) – director
 Grandchild Of Kings (1992) (Off-Broadway) – adaptation (from the stories of Seán O'Casey) director and adapter
 Kiss of the Spider Woman (1993) – director
 Show Boat (1994) – director
 The Petrified Prince (1994) Off-Broadway – director
 Whistle Down the Wind (1996) Washington, DC
 Candide (1997) – director
 Parade (1998) – director, co-conceiver
 3hree (2000) – supervisor, director (The Flight of the Lawnchair Man)
 Hollywood Arms (2002) – producer, director
 Bounce (2003) – director
 LoveMusik (2007) – director
 Paradise Found (2010) – director
 Prince of Broadway (2015) – director

Filmography
 Something for Everyone (1970) – director
 A Little Night Music (1977) – director

Awards and nominations
Sources: Playbill (vault); Internet Broadway Database; Los Angeles Times

Bibliography
Prince, Harold, Contradictions: Notes on Twenty-six Years in the Theatre, Dodd, Mead  (1974 autobiography)
Prince, Harold (1993), Grandchild of Kings, Samuel French
Hirsch, Foster (1989, rev 2005), Harold Prince and the American Musical Theatre, Applause Books, (with Prince providing extensive interviews and the foreword), 
Ilson, Carol (1989), Harold Prince: From Pajama Game To Phantom of the Opera And Beyond, Cambridge University Press, 
Ilson, Carol (2000), Harold Prince: A Director's Journey, Limelight Series, Hal Leonard Corporation 
Napoleon, Davi, Chelsea on the Edge: The Adventures of an American Theater, Iowa State University Press (Includes a preface by Prince and a full chapter about the production of Candide)
Brunet, Daniel; Angel Esquivel Rios, Miguel; and Geraths, Armin (2006), Creating the "New Musical": Harold Prince in Berlin, Peter Lang Publishing
Thelen, Lawrence (1999), The Show Makers: Great Directors of the American Musical Theatre, Routledge
Guernsey, Otis L. (Editor) (1985), Broadway Song and Story: Playwrights/Lyricists/Composers Discuss Their Hits, Dodd Mead

References

External links

Harold Prince Downstage Center interview at American Theatre Wing.org, May 2008
Harold Prince papers, 1954–1999, held by the Billy Rose Theatre Division, New York Public Library for the Performing Arts
Harold Prince papers at the Library of Congress
Ruth Mitchell papers, 1887–1999 (bulk 1946–1999), held by the Billy Rose Theatre Division, New York Public Library for the Performing Arts
Harold Prince scores, 1955–1983, held by the Music Division, New York Public Library for the Performing Arts
Interview with Harold Prince by Bruce Duffie, November 11, 1982

1928 births
2019 deaths
American adoptees
American expatriates in Switzerland
American musical theatre directors
American people of German-Jewish descent
American theatre directors
American theatre managers and producers
Broadway theatre directors
Broadway theatre producers
Drama Desk Award winners
Film directors from New York City
Kennedy Center honorees
Military personnel from New York City
People from Manhattan
Special Tony Award recipients
Tony Award winners
United States National Medal of Arts recipients
University of Pennsylvania alumni